Brian O'Meara (born 5 April 1976, Co. Cork) is an Irish former rugby union player. 
After winning two senior cups with PBC, he joined Cork Con, playing in four AIL Finals, winning one. He won 99 caps for Leinster, after moving from Munster whom he played with from 1997 - 2000. He would return and make an additional six appearances for Munster in the 2006–07 season. He also won 9 caps for Ireland between 1997 and 2003, including two appearances at the 1999 Rugby World Cup. He is the 6th highest point scorer for Leinster rugby behind Ian Madigan, Johnny Sexton, Felipe Contepomi and Ross Byrne.

References

Living people
1976 births
Irish rugby union players
Ireland international rugby union players
Munster Rugby players
Leinster Rugby players
Cork Constitution players
Rugby union players from County Cork
Rugby union scrum-halves